Sidi Maârouf is a district in Jijel Province, Algeria. It was named after its capital, Sidi Maârouf.

Municipalities
The district is further divided into 2 municipalities:
Sidi Maârouf
Ouled Rabah